Sphallambyx chabrillacii is a species of beetle in the family Cerambycidae. It was described by Thomson in 1857. It is known from Brazil.

References

Cerambycini
Beetles described in 1857